The 2013 AFC Cup was the tenth edition of the AFC Cup, a football competition organized by the Asian Football Confederation (AFC) for clubs from "developing countries" in Asia.

In an all-Kuwait final, defending champions Al-Kuwait defeated Al-Qadsia 2–0 to win their third AFC Cup title in five years, and became the first team to win the AFC Cup three times. Both finalists also qualified for the 2014 AFC Champions League.

Allocation of entries per association
The AFC laid out the procedure for deciding the participating associations and the allocation of slots, with the final decision to be made by the AFC in November 2012. The following changes to the list of participating associations may be made from the 2012 AFC Cup if the AFC approved the following applications made by any association:
An association originally participating in the AFC Cup may apply to participate in the 2013 AFC Champions League. An association may participate in both the AFC Champions League and the AFC Cup if it only partially fulfills the AFC Champions League criteria.
An association originally participating in the AFC President's Cup may apply to participate in the 2013 AFC Cup.

The following changes in the participating associations were made compared to the previous year:
Losers of the AFC Champions League qualifying play-off did not participate in the AFC Cup.
Tajikistan clubs' participation was upgraded from the AFC President's Cup to the AFC Cup starting from 2013 by the AFC.

Each participating association was given two entries:
Team 1 (league champions) of each association directly entered the group stage.
Team 2 (cup winners or league runners-up) of each association either directly entered the group stage or entered the qualifying play-off, depending on the evaluation by the AFC.

Teams
The following teams entered the competition.

Al-Muharraq (Bahrain) withdrew after the draw was held. As a result, Regar-TadAZ (Tajikistan), which were initially to enter the qualifying play-off, instead directly entered the group stage, and only two teams participated in the qualifying play-off.

Notes

Schedule
The schedule of the competition was as follows (all draws held at AFC headquarters in Kuala Lumpur, Malaysia).

For 2013, the round of 16 continued to be played as a single match instead of over two legs on a home-and-away basis as originally planned.

Qualifying play-off

The draw for the qualifying play-off was held on 6 December 2012. Each tie was played as a single match, with extra time and penalty shoot-out used to decide the winner if necessary. The winner advanced to the group stage to join the 31 automatic qualifiers.

Due to the withdrawal of Al-Muharraq after the draw was held, Regar-TadAZ, which were initially drawn to play the winner between Al-Wahda and Al-Ahli Taizz for a place in the group stage, were directly entered into Group A, while the winner between Al-Wahda and Al-Ahli Taizz would be entered into Group B to replace Al-Muharraq.

|}

Group stage

The draw for the group stage was held on 6 December 2012. The 32 teams were drawn into eight groups of four. Teams from the same association could not be drawn into the same group. Each group was played on a home-and-away round-robin basis. The winners and runners-up of each group advanced to the round of 16.

Tiebreakers
The teams are ranked according to points (3 points for a win, 1 point for a tie, 0 points for a loss). If tied on points, tiebreakers are applied in the following order:
Greater number of points obtained in the group matches between the teams concerned
Goal difference resulting from the group matches between the teams concerned
Greater number of goals scored in the group matches between the teams concerned (away goals do not apply)
Goal difference in all the group matches
Greater number of goals scored in all the group matches
Penalty shoot-out if only two teams are involved and they are both on the field of play
Fewer score calculated according to the number of yellow and red cards received in the group matches (1 point for a single yellow card, 3 points for a red card as a consequence of two yellow cards, 3 points for a direct red card, 4 points for a yellow card followed by a direct red card)
Drawing of lots

Group A

Tiebreakers
Al-Riffa are ranked ahead of Safa on head-to-head record.

Group B

Group C

Group D

Group E

Group F

Tiebreakers
New Radiant and Yangon United are tied on head-to-head record, and so are ranked by overall goal difference.

Group G

Group H

Tiebreakers
Selangor are ranked ahead of Sài Gòn Xuân Thành on head-to-head record.

Knock-out stage

In the knock-out stage, the 16 teams played a single-elimination tournament. In the quarter-finals and semi-finals, each tie was played on a home-and-away two-legged basis, while in the round of 16 and final, each tie was played as a single match. The away goals rule (for two-legged ties), extra time (away goals do not apply in extra time) and penalty shoot-out were used to decide the winner if necessary.

Bracket

Round of 16
In the round of 16, the winners of one group played the runners-up of another group in the same zone, with the group winners hosting the match.

|-
!colspan=3|West Asia Zone

|-
!colspan=3|East Asia Zone

|}

Quarter-finals
The draw for the quarter-finals, semi-finals, and final (to decide the host team) was held on 20 June 2013. In this draw, teams from different zones could play each other, and the "country protection" rule was applied: if there are two teams from the same association, they may not play each other in the quarter-finals.

|}

Semi-finals

|}

Final

Awards

Top scorers

See also
2013 AFC Champions League
2013 AFC President's Cup

References

External links

 
2
2013